{{Automatic taxobox
| taxon = Neppia
| authority = Ball, 1974
| subdivision = 
see text<ref>*Tyler S, Schilling S, Hooge M, and Bush LF (comp.) (2006-2012) Turbellarian taxonomic database. Version 1.7  Database </ref>
}}Neppia is a genus of dugesiid triclad that is found in South America, Subantarctic region, Africa, Tasmania and New Zealand.Sluys, R.; Kawakatsu, M. 2001: Contribution to an inventory of the freshwater planarians of Australia and New Zealand (Platyhelminthes, Tricladida, Dugesiidae), with distribution maps of the species examined. Beaufortia, 51: 163-198

Until 1974 Neppia was considered a subgenus of Dugesia.

Phylogeny and taxonomy
Phylogenetic tree including five dugesiid genera after Álvarez-Presas et al., 2008:

SpeciesNeppia evelinae (Marcus, 1955)Neppia falklandica (Westblad, 1952)Neppia jeanneli (Beauchamp, 1913)Neppia magnibursalis Sluys & Kawakatsu, 2001Neppia montana (Nurse, 1950)Neppia paeta (Marcus, 1955)Neppia tinga (Marcus, 1955)Neppia wimbimba'' (Marcus, 1970)

References

Dugesiidae
Rhabditophora genera